Pay the Girl is a rock band from Cincinnati, Ohio.

History
Lead singer Jason Allen Phelps first started performing in local venues in the Cincinnati area in the late 1990s, and decided to form a band in 2001. The group put out a demo EP soon after, which resulted in their signing with TVT Records in 2002, who landed a song of theirs, "Clueless", on the soundtrack to Swimfan. Later in 2002, the band opened for Shakira on her worldwide tour. TVT released their self-titled debut album in 2003, and the song "Freeze" peaked at #21 on the Billboard Adult Top 40 chart that same year.

Discography
Demo EP (2002)
Pay the Girl (TVT Records, 2003)

Members
Jason Allen Phelps-vocals, guitar
Mark Cooper-guitar, background vocals
Dave Harris-guitar
Drew Phillips-bass
Greg Braun-drums

'Former members
Josh Seurkamp-drums
Mike Georgin-bass (formerly of Over the Rhine and Plow on Boy)

References

TVT Records artists
Musical groups from Cincinnati